Maggie Furey (née Armstrong) was a British fantasy writer who was born in Northumberland, England, UK in 1955. A qualified teacher, she wrote fantasy since 1994, and is best known for the Artefacts of Power tetralogy. A resident in County Wicklow in Ireland for many years, she died there in 2016.

Life

Career
Furey was a qualified teacher. She also reviewed books on BBC Radio Newcastle, was an advisor in the Durham Reading Resources Centre, and organized children's book fairs. In later life, she lived in County Wicklow in Ireland.  

She died in 2016 and, after a funeral in the town of Wicklow, was cremated at Mount Jerome Cemetery.

Writing
She is best known for the Artefacts of Power tetralogy, which is centred on the lead character (and first novel namesake) Aurian, published as paperback originals in the United States and UK, as well as translated hard-covers in Russia.

Bibliography 

The Artefacts of Power
 Aurian (1994),  (UK)/ (US) /  (RU)
Harp of Winds (1995),  (UK)/ (US) / 5-88196-814-Х (RU)
Sword of Flame (1996),  (UK)/ (US) /  (RU)
Dhiammara (1997),  (UK)/ (US) /  (RU)

The Web Series
see The Web (series)

 

The Shadowleague
The Heart of Myrial (1999),  (UK)/ (US)/ (RU)
The Spirit of the Stone (2001),  (UK)/ (US)/ (RU)
The Eye of Eternity (UK) (2002),  (UK)/Echo of Eternity (US) (2003),  (RU)

Chronicles of the Xandim
Heritage of the Xandim (2008),  (hardcover)/ (paperback) (both UK)
Exodus of the Xandim (2013),  (UK)

External links
Official Web Site

Obituary

1955 births
British fantasy writers
British expatriates in Ireland
2016 deaths